Gelion may refer to:
 Gelion (Middle-Earth): a fictional river in Tolkien's legendarium
 Gelion (company): A company that produces gell zinc-bromine batteries

fr:Gelion
it:Gelion
sv:Gelion